PurifyPlus is a memory debugger program used by software developers to detect memory access errors in programs, especially those written in C or C++. It was originally written by Reed Hastings of Pure Software.  Pure Software later merged with Atria Software to form Pure Atria Software, which in turn was later acquired by Rational Software, which in turn was acquired by IBM, and then divested to UNICOM Systems, Inc. on Dec 31, 2014. It is functionally similar to other memory debuggers, such as Insure++, Valgrind and  BoundsChecker.

Overview
PurifyPlus allows dynamic verification, a process by which a program discovers errors that occur when the program runs, much like a debugger.  Static verification or static code analysis, by contrast, involves detecting errors in the source code without ever compiling or running it, just by discovering logical inconsistencies.  The type checking by a C compiler is an example of static verification.

When a program is linked with PurifyPlus, corrected verification code is automatically inserted into the executable by parsing and adding to the object code, including libraries.  That way, if a memory error occurs, the program will print out the exact location of the error, the memory address involved, and other relevant information.  PurifyPlus also detects memory leaks. By default, a leak report is generated at program exit but can also be generated by calling the PurifyPlus leak-detection API from within an instrumented application.

The errors that PurifyPlus discovers include array bounds reads and writes, trying to access unallocated memory, freeing unallocated memory (usually due to freeing the same memory for the second time), as well as memory leaks (allocated memory with no pointer reference). Most of these errors are not fatal (at least not at the site of the error), and often when just running the program there is no way to detect them, except by observing that something is wrong due to incorrect program behavior.  Hence PurifyPlus helps by detecting these errors and telling the programmer exactly where they occur.  Because PurifyPlus works by instrumenting all the object code, it detects errors that occur inside of third-party or operating system libraries.  These errors are often caused by the programmer passing incorrect arguments to the library calls, or by misunderstandings about the protocols for freeing data structures used by the libraries.  These are often the most difficult errors to find and fix.

Differences from traditional debuggers
The ability to detect non-fatal errors is a major distinction between PurifyPlus and similar programs from the usual debuggers.  By contrast, debuggers generally only allow the programmer to quickly find the sources of fatal errors, such as a program crash due to dereferencing a null pointer, but do not help to detect the non-fatal memory errors.  Debuggers are useful for other things that PurifyPlus is not intended for, such as for stepping through the code line by line or examining the program's memory by hand at a particular moment of execution.  In other words, these tools can complement each other for a skilled developer.

PurifyPlus also includes other functionality, such as high-performance watchpoints, which are of general use while using a debugger on one's code.

It is worth noting that using PurifyPlus makes the most sense in programming languages that leave memory management to the programmer.  Hence, in Java, Lisp, or Visual Basic, for example, automatic memory management reduces occurrence of any memory leaks. These languages can however still have leaks; unnecessary references to objects will prevent the memory from being re-allocated. IBM has a product called Rational Application Developer to uncover these sorts of errors.

Supported platforms

Supported C/C++ platforms

Supported Java/.NET platforms

See also 

 Memory debugger
 Programming tool
 Dynamic memory
 Memory leak

References

External links
 "A Survey of Systems for Detecting Serial Run-Time Errors" by The Iowa State University’s High Performance Computing Group

Debuggers
Memory management software
Purify
Divested IBM products